Sweden proper (literally Actual Sweden) is a term used to distinguish those territories that were fully integrated into the Kingdom of Sweden, as opposed to the dominions and possessions of, or states in union with, Sweden. Only the estates of the realm of Sweden proper were represented in the Riksdag of the Estates.

Specifically this means that, from approximately 1155–1156 until the Treaty of Fredrikshamn in 1809, Sweden proper included the bulk of present-day Finland as a fully integrated part of the realm.  After 1809, however, the term has been used to distinguish the western part from the former eastern half of the realm, i.e. Sweden from Finland.

Skåne, Halland, Blekinge, and Bohuslän, formerly parts of Denmark and Norway, came under the Swedish Crown by the Treaty of Roskilde in 1658, but it was not until 1719 that they were fully integrated and became part of Sweden proper.

Sweden proper, a geographical reference that has changed over time, contrasts with Finland Proper, a province in southwestern Finland that gave its name to all of Finland.

See also 
Svealand
Sweden–Finland
Lands of Sweden
Provinces of Sweden

References 

Proper
Political geography
Proper
Historical regions
Former subdivisions of Sweden
Metropolitan or continental parts of states